The Paw Paw River is located in the U.S. state of Michigan in the southwest portion of the lower peninsula. It flows approximately  through Van Buren County and Berrien County until joining the St. Joseph River just above its mouth on Lake Michigan at Benton Harbor.

History
Native Americans named the Paw Paw River after the paw paw fruit that grew abundantly along the river's banks.

Ecology and conservation
The watershed includes rare Great Lakes marshes and floodplain forests, which serve as habitats for migratory birds such as the prothonotary warbler (commonly known as the golden swamp warbler), as well as the endangered Mitchell's satyr butterfly. Other rare species include the massasauga rattlesnake and the spotted turtle.

In November 2003, The Nature Conservancy announced the purchase of 139 acres (0.6 km2) in the Paw Paw Prairie Fen, located in the East Branch of the river near Mattawan. The Sarett Nature Center owns 800 acres (3.2 km2) of along the river in Berrien County, just north of Benton Harbor.

The Paw Paw River has 39 species of fish including walleye, bass, bluegill, black crappie, and northern pike. The mainstem is a coolwater stream as evidenced by the presence of burbot and mottled sculpin, it also contains hornyhead chub, common shiner, johnny darter, and walleye. Several riparian wetlands provide excellent habitat for northern pike. The fish community near the mouth is influenced by its proximity to Lake Michigan, and steelhead trout (Oncorhynchus mykiss) are stocked there. Potamodromous trout and salmon have access to most of the river system, and are shore-fished in the fall upstream of Hartford. There are 24 registered dams within the Paw Paw River sub-watershed, but these dams are all low head dams or on small tributaries, so potamodromous trout and salmon can migrate into its headwaters at Campbell Creek.

Watershed

Tributaries of the main branch include:
Sand Creek and Blue Creek in Benton Township
Ryno Drain in Coloma
Mill Creek near Watervliet
Paw Paw Lake and Little Paw Paw Lake (in Berrien County) near Watervliet
Pine Creek between Hartford and Watervliet
Mud Lake Drain between Hartford and Watervliet
Hog Creek near Hartford
Brush Creek near Lawrence
Carter Creek between Paw Paw and Lawrence

North branch tributaries include:
Brandywine Creek
Hayden Creek
Ritter Creek
Todd Drain
Campbell Creek
The north branch headwaters arise in springs near the Wolf Lake State Fish Hatchery.

South branch tributaries include:
The east branch is about 8.5 miles (14 km) long and arises from two main sources: Paw Paw Lake (in Kalamazoo County) and Mattawan Creek in the village of Mattawan. It joins the South Branch in the city of Paw Paw.
Three Mile Lake Drain, south of Paw Paw
Eagle Lake Drain, south of Paw Paw
Lawton Drain, east of Lawton
The south branch headwaters arise in Decatur Township in eastern Van Buren County.

References

External links
the Nature Conservancy purchase
1995 DNR survey of the East Branch
Paw Paw River Watershed
Paw Paw River Watershed Management Plan
Sarett Nature Center
Southwest Michigan Planning Commission
Two Rivers Coalition

Rivers of Michigan
Rivers of Berrien County, Michigan
Rivers of Van Buren County, Michigan
Tributaries of Lake Michigan